The Fiumarella rail disaster was one of the most serious incidents in the history of the Italian railways. It occurred at about 7.45 am on 23 December 1961, at the Fiumarella viaduct, near Catanzaro, in the region of Calabria, southern Italy.

History
The train involved in the disaster was composed of Breda M2.123 class diesel railcar and Breda trailer RA 1006.

The accident occurred as the train was passing over the curved Fiumarella viaduct, about an hour after departing from Soveria Mannelli for Catanzaro at 6:43 am. Inside the trailer there were 99 passengers, many of them students. Seventy-one of them lost their lives on impact, and 28 others were injured to varying degrees. This resulted as the worst rail disaster in peacetime Italy.

Consequences
The incident sparked a heated parliamentary debate, which led the Italian Government (by Law 1855 of 23 December 1963) to revoke the grant to the Mediterranea Calabro Lucane of the right to operate the line, and appoint a Managing Government Commissioner of Ferrovie Calabro Lucane.  Rail traffic on the line remained disrupted for some years, and between Catanzaro and Soveria Mannelli it was temporarily replaced by road vehicles.

At Decollatura, place of origin of a substantial number of the victims, a monument was erected in memory of the fallen.

References

This article is based upon a translation of the Italian language version.

Catanzaro
Derailments in Italy
Railway accidents in 1961
1961 in Italy
Transport in Calabria
December 1961 events in Europe